Dominant species may mean:

Dominant species (ecology), one of a small number of species which dominate in an ecological community
 Dominant Species (novel) by Michael E. Marks
Dominant Species (board game)
Dominant Species (video game)
 Dominant Species (album), an album by New Zealand singer King Kapisi